Daniela Paola Souza Naranjo (born 27 August 1999) is a Mexican taekwondo athlete of combat or kyorugi modality. She won the gold medal in the women's flyweight event at the 2022 World Taekwondo Championships held in Guadalajara, Mexico.

She has won bronze at the World Taekwondo Junior Championships in 2016, the gold medal at the Barranquilla Central American and Caribbean Games in 2018 and at the 2019 Pan American Games in the –49 kg category.

She participated in the 2019 World Taekwondo Championships in Manchester, reaching the quarterfinals of the flyweight tournament. After advancing on a first-round bye, she defeated Bouma Coulibaly from Ivory Coast and Abishag Semberg of Israel before falling to two-time Olympic gold medalist Wu Jingyu.

She was born in Zapopan, but considers Tijuana her hometown.

References 

Living people
1999 births
Mexican female taekwondo practitioners
People from Zapopan, Jalisco
Sportspeople from Tijuana
Pan American Games medalists in taekwondo
Pan American Games gold medalists for Mexico
Taekwondo practitioners at the 2019 Pan American Games
Central American and Caribbean Games medalists in taekwondo
Central American and Caribbean Games gold medalists for Mexico
Competitors at the 2018 Central American and Caribbean Games
Medalists at the 2019 Pan American Games
21st-century Mexican women
World Taekwondo Championships medalists
21st-century Mexican people